Hà Nam is a province of northern Vietnam, in the Red River Delta. The province's name derives from Sino-Vietnamese 河南, meaning "south of the river".

History
Hà Nam, and Vietnam as a whole, implemented the second five-year plan between 1975 and 1980. This plan included protecting the country's national border and gradually overcoming difficulties within the country itself. Between 1981 and 1985, the administration attempted to improve the society and culture of Vietnam. 

The years between 1975 and 1985 were a difficult time for the country in general and for Hà Nam province in particular. In this period, the society and economy of Vietnam went through a number of severe difficulties and the majority of the population's standard of living was very low. Despite these events, Hà Nam still managed to make some important gains.

Administration divisions
Hà Nam is subdivided into six district-level sub-divisions:

 4 districts:
 Bình Lục
 Kim Bảng
 Lý Nhân
 Thanh Liêm

 1 provincial city:
 Phủ Lý
 1 town:
 Duy Tiên

They are further subdivided into seven commune-level towns (or townlets), 98 communes, and 11 wards.

Improved crops
Throughout this period, Hà Nam province concentrated their efforts on implementing an extensive irrigation system, widening the area suitable for growing crops, developing the manner in which cattle were raised in the area and applying technical scientific advances. As a result of these operations, a high number of co-operatives in the province reached five tons per hectare by 1987. Furthermore, agrarian districts supplied tens of thousands of tonnes of food for the state.

The handicraft industries continued to develop in both the quantity and the quality of the products being produced. Basic education standards developed quickly and equally. The areas of information culture, medical and sports were opened and intensified at a grassroots level.

The Sino-Vietnamese War, which broke out during February 1979, had a direct influence on the socio-economic situation in Hà Nam province in particular. Hà Nam province's population became involved in the struggling movement via military enrollment and the local military force began assisting the defense and security plans of the nation.

Throughout the early years of the 1980s, Vietnam became involved in implementing the Third five-year plan as a result of changes in the global climate. The population and the various sectors faced a number of difficulties, including the delivery of raw materials and food. The instability of the economy intensified, resulting in rapid inflation and soaring prices.

The release of Decree 100/CT/TW on January 13, 1981, was an effective measure to boost activeness and creation in production and delivery. This managed to bring the nation's agriculture problems under control.

From 1981 to 1985, Hà Nam's co-efficient use of land increased from 1.5 to 1.76 and food productivity continued to rise throughout this  period. The industrial and small handicraft services created plenty of jobs for laborers. Furthermore, localities became increasingly involved in exporting goods such as jute, groundnut, garlic and sesame.

The standards of education were maintained and continued to follow the objectives of the reforms passed. Oriental and western medicine were integrated effectively in examination procedures. The media soon gained access to undiscovered knowledge and continued to help meet political aims in the province.

An embroidering enterprise
(Thanh Hà - Thanh Liêm)

In 1986, the country became involved in a renovation process. The administrative subsidy mechanism was erased, creating favorable conditions for developing a multi-sector economy. The economic and investment structure focused on four socio-economic programs. Social-cultural, technical science and medical activities were intensified and agriculture increased remarkably. The private economy continued to develop, attracting many laborers and banking and financial operations found their place in society.

A corner of Phủ Lý Park

In late 1966, Hà Nam's agricultural production gained a total productivity value of VND960.84 billion: food production achieved 319.435 tons. The average food allowance was 402 kg per head. In addition to the main rice crop, maize, groundnut and peanut crops continued to strengthen. Cattle and poultry production rose 3-5% per annum.

Water surface areas were used to develop aquatic products. For example, thousands of bamboo trees were planted to protect dikes, millions of cubic meters of land were dug, covered and dredged and thousands of cubic meters of stones were used to cover the channels.

Street in safety

In the field of industry and small handicraft production, during the era of the early 1990s, despite a number of difficulties in obtaining materials, certain products were still being developed. For example, Thanh Hà embroidery, Kiện Khê stone, An Đổ smoothing, Động Sơn knitting and Đại Thành weaving.

The industrial production value of 1996 was VND286.75 billion, including VND19.11 billion from the central industry and VND267.64 from the local industries. At this time, a private enterprise consisting of nine bases was set up and attracted nearly 400 laborers.

References

External links 
 Government of Hà Nam  

 
Provinces of Vietnam